David Pérez Sanz and Max Schnur were the defending champions but chose not to defend their title.

Sander Gillé and Joran Vliegen won the title after defeating Lucas Gómez and Juan Ignacio Londero 6–2, 6–7(5–7), [10–3] in the final.

Seeds

Draw

References
 Main Draw

Tampere Open - Men's Doubles
2017 Men's Doubles